{{Speciesbox
| status = LC
| status_system = IUCN3.1
| status_ref = 
| taxon = Leachia danae
| authority = (Joubin, 1931)<ref name = WoRMS>{{cite web | url = http://www.marinespecies.org/aphia.php?p=taxdetails&id=559389 | title = Leachia danae (Joubin, 1931) | accessdate = 26 February 2018 | publisher = Flanders Marine Institute | author = Julian Finn | year = 2016 | work = World Register of Marine Species}}</ref>
| synonyms = Drechselia danae Joubin, 1931 
}}Leachia danae'' is a species of glass squid first described in 1931 in the Eastern tropical Pacific Ocean. It has since also been observed off the Mexican Pacific coast.

References

External links

Squid
Molluscs described in 1931